Charlotte Sophia Burne (1850–1923) was an English author and editor, and the first woman to become president of the Folklore Society.

Life
Charlotte Sophia Burne was born on 2 May 1850 at Moreton vicarage in Staffordshire, near to the border with Shropshire, the first of Charlotte and Sambrooke Burne's six children. Her parents had arrived the day before, after leaving Loynton Hall on an ancestral estate in Staffordshire, as the guests of the reverend Tom Burne. The family moved to Summerhill, Edgmond, in Shropshire in 1854, having exhausted their welcome. Her father received debilitating injuries in a hunting accident several years later, causing to the family to move as the burden of his care was shared amongst the extended Burne family. She was sent to Loynton Hall for holidays, which was now occupied by mainly unmarried aunts who reported she was undisciplined. Lotty, as she was called, suffered several serious illnesses during her early years, conditions of ill health and obesity would impede her physical well-being throughout her life.

Works
Burne's works include the large collection, Shropshire Folklore, and preparation of the second edition of the Folklore Society's official Handbook of Folklore, she also contributed over seventy articles and reviews to its journals. Her appointment to various positions in the Society was unusual, having been previously held by its London members, and she was the first woman to become President or editor of its publications. A small amount of other material was published in newspapers and magazines.

Despite the firsts, penetrating gender and regional barriers, and serving the society for forty years, during a well-documented period of its history, details of her life and works are inadequately noticed. Some correspondence of Burne with leading members Alice Bertha and G. Laurence Gomme is contained in the Society's archives, but her personal papers seem to have been destroyed. A vague and inaccurate portrait of her life and works was given in references to her in Richard Dorson's history of the British folklorists (1968); J. C. Burne, a great nephew, drew on letters and recollections of her family for a "tactful biography" published in 1975. An obituary was published by E. Sidney Hartland.

Burne's interest in history and antiquities, and subsequently folk-lore, was probably fostered by her mother. She was prompted by those connected to the family to compile a genealogical history of the Mildmay family, her first manuscript for this still exists, and the editing of the poet Richard Barnfield works. Her talents as an editor were initially recognised in R. W. Eyton's acknowledgements in his Doomsday Studies and the subsequent accolades in a local newspaper.

In 1875 Burne became friendly with Georgina Frederica Jackson, who was collecting material for her Shropshire Word Book (1879) and its companion work with the provisional title of "Folk-lore Gleanings". Jackson's demise led Burne to take over her material, adding her own collection of tales to produce Shropshire Folk-Lore: A Sheaf of Gleanings, her first major work. This exhaustive collection was well received and continues to be favourably viewed, her obituary gave the remark "the first time the folklore of a county was published—at any rate in a form so complete and so scientific" (Hartland, 1923) and later folklorist Katharine Briggs describing it as "perhaps the best county folklore book we possess as well as the most monumental".

In the early 1890s she resided at Pyebirch, Eccleshall, in north Staffordshire.  There she collaborated the local folklorist and folk-song collector Miss Alice Annie Keary, of Stoke-on-Trent.  Together they spent three years circa 1890-1893 collecting materials locally in north Staffordshire.  While a number of joint papers were published, Burne moved to Cheltenham circa 1894, and the project failed to be realised in book form.

Burne's approach to the systematic collection of folklore gave emphasis to classification of material, and the means by which it was obtained. She wrote two essays on collection, and contributed to an ongoing discourse on fieldwork, proposing that the way she interviewed produced material uncorrupted by cautious retelling or embellishment. She also promoted the importance of documenting the historical and regional context of the tales, and accounting for the substitution and changes in the characters and incidents of these; their influence by economic, local, and personal factors is indicated in her earliest works and developed in her later articles and essays.

References

External links
 

Folklore writers
English folklorists
Women folklorists
1923 deaths
1850 births
Writers from Shropshire
Presidents of the Folklore Society
19th-century English women writers
19th-century English writers
20th-century English women writers